Birrisito is a district of the Paraíso canton, in the Cartago province of Costa Rica.

History 
The district was proposed on 13 July 2020 by the deputy Paola Valladares (PLN-Cartago) under the file 22076 of the Legislative Assembly, which was approved in a second debate on 12 July 2021 and eventually created under Law No.° 10004, signed on 28 July 2021 and published in La Gaceta No.° 158 of 18 August 2021.

Due to the general elections of 2022, the district would be incorporated until the after that event.

It was segregated from Paraíso, the first district of the canton.

Geography 
Birrisito has an area of  km2 and an elevation of  metres. 

It is located 8 km southeast of Cartago.

Demographics 
As of the 2011 census, the district hasn't been created and its population was part of Paraíso district.

Locations 
 Head town: Birrisito.
 Hamlets: La Huerta, El Alto Jesús de la Misericordia (Alto Birrisito), El Carmen neighborhood, el Chiral.

Economy

Agriculture 
There are crops of tomato, sweet chili, cucumber, beans, corn, vegetables, sweet potatoes, chayote and also coffee.

Tourism 
There is rural tourism potential.

Transportation

Road transportation 
The district is covered by the following road routes:
 National Route 10
 National Route 224

References 

Districts of Cartago Province
Populated places in Cartago Province
Populated places established in 2021